Dog Days is a 2011 Japanese fantasy anime television series created by Masaki Tsuzuki. The series revolves around Shinku Izumi, a cheerful and athletic half-Japanese, half-English boy studying at Kinokawa International School in Japan who is suddenly summoned to the alternate world of Flonyard. The people there look no different from humans, except for one thing; they have animal ears and tails. The one who summoned him is Millhiore, the dog-like Princess of the Biscotti Republic, who requested his assistance in their war against the forces of the feline-like Galette Lion Dominion. The wars in Flonyard differ from the ones on Earth, and are waged with special rules and no casualties in a fashion similar to a sports competition with the purpose to raise funds for the Kingdoms involved, where the winner faction claims a larger sum than the losing side.

After winning his first battle for Biscotti, Shinku learns that when a hero is summoned into Flonyard he becomes unable to return to his homeworld, a fact that Millhiore also was unaware of. The scientists of Biscotti promise to Shinku to find a way for him to return home in 16 days, the remaining time until his meeting with his friend Rebecca whom he promised to spend the last three days of his spring break with.

Dog Days is produced by Aniplex and Seven Arcs under the directorship of Keizo Kusakawa, with series composition by Masaki Tsuzuki, character designs by Osamu Sakata, music by I've Sound, Maiko Iuchi, Susumu Natsume and Yui Isshiki, and produced by the production company Project DD. The series aired 13 episodes from April 2 to June 25, 2011 on Tokyo MX, Tochigi TV, Gunma TV, Chiba TV, TVK, TV Saitama and MBS, with subsequent runs on CBC and BS11. Six DVD and Blu-ray Disc volumes were released by Aniplex between July 27 and December 21, 2011.

A second anime season, called , aired 13 episodes from July 7 to September 29, 2012 on Tokyo MX, with subsequent broadcasts on CBC, Chiba TV, TV Kanagawa, TV Saitama, Tochigi TV, Gunma TV, KBS Kyoto, Sun Television, and BS11. The second season is produced by Aniplex and Seven Arcs, as with the first season, albeit with Junji Nishimura replacing Keizo Kusakawa as director. The second season follows Shinku's return to Flonyard three months after the events of the first season, with Rebecca and his cousin Nanami accompanying him. Nanami joins the Galette Lion Dominion as their hero, while Rebecca joins the newly introduced, squirrel-like Principality of Pastillage, led by First Princess Couvert, as their hero. A third anime season, called   aired 12 episodes from January 10 to March 28, 2015.

For the first season, the opening theme is "Scarlet Knight" by Nana Mizuki, and the ending theme is "Presenter" by Yui Horie, both produced and composed by Elements Garden. The opening theme for the third season is "No Limit" by Nana Mizuki and the ending theme song is "Stay With Me" by Yui Horie.

Series overview

Episode list

Dog Days (2011)

Dog Days' (2012)

Dog Days" (2015)

References

External links
 
 

Lists of anime episodes